Colin Dunmore Fuller (1882–1953) was an Australian farmer and soldier who served in World War One.

Biography 

He was born on 10 February 1882 in Kiama, New South Wales.

He was the son of George Lawrence Fuller.

His eldest brother George Warburton Fuller was the 22nd Premier of New South Wales.

He got married to Amy Elsie Blanche Rea at St Luke's Anglican Church, Mosman, Sydney on 10 March 1920.

He died of lung cancer on 19 September 1953 in Sydney, Australia.

His cemetery is at the Woronora Memorial Park, Sutherland, New South Wales.

Education 

He completed his schooling at the Sydney Church of England Grammar School.

Career  

In his youth, he worked as a horseman and a farmer.

Military Career 

He enlisted as a lieutenant in the 6th Light Horse Regiment (Australia) and rose through the ranks to become a lieutenant colonel. He commanded the unit during the Gallipoli Campaign.

Awards and Honours 

He was Mentioned in Despatches for his military service.

For his military services, he was published in The London Gazette. He also received a Distinguished Service Order at the 1917 New Year Honours.

He also received an Order of the Nile award for his services in World War One.

References

External links 
 Australian Dictionary Biography 1
 World War One service
 Regimental history

Australian soldiers
1882 births
1953 deaths